Priliximab (cMT 412) is a human-mouse chimeric anti-CD4 monoclonal antibody. It has been tested on patients with Crohn's disease and multiple sclerosis but has not yet received U.S. Food and Drug Administration licensing. The patent belongs to the biotechnology company Centocor.

References

Janssen Biotech
Experimental drugs